The 2018 Winter Olympics medal table is a list of National Olympic Committees ranked by the number of medals won during the 2018 Winter Olympics, held in Pyeongchang County (stylized as PyeongChang for the games), South Korea, from 9–25 February 2018. The games featured 102 events in 15 sports, making it the first Winter Olympics to surpass 100 medal events. Four new disciplines in existing sports were introduced to the Winter Olympic program in Pyeongchang, including big air snowboarding, mixed doubles curling, mass start speed skating, and mixed team alpine skiing.

The Netherlands achieved a podium sweep in speed skating, in the women's 3,000 metres. Norway achieved a podium sweep in cross-country skiing, in the men's 30 km skiathlon. Germany achieved a podium sweep in nordic combined, in the individual large hill/10 km. At the 2018 Winter Olympics, athletes were tied in three events. In the women's 10 km cross-country skiing, two bronze medals were awarded due to a tie. In the two-man bobsleigh, two gold medals and no silver medal were awarded due to a tie. In the four-man bobsleigh, two silver medals and no bronze medal were awarded due to a tie.

Going in, Canada held the record for most gold medals won at a single Winter Olympics with 14, which it won in Vancouver in 2010.  This mark was equalled by both Norway and Germany at these Olympics. Norway set the record for most total medals at a single Winter Olympics with 39, surpassing the 37 medals of the United States won at the 2010 Winter Olympics. The mark of 30 NOCs winning medals is the highest for any Winter Olympic Games.  Hungary won its first Winter Olympic gold medal ever. Norwegian cross-country skier Marit Bjørgen (two gold, one silver, and two bronze) achieved five medals, more than any other athlete. With 15 medals, she became the most decorated athlete in Winter Olympics history. Swedish cross-country skier Charlotte Kalla finished with four medals (one gold, three silver), as did her compatriot and fellow cross-country skier Stina Nilsson (one gold, two silvers, one bronze) and Russian cross-country skier Alexander Bolshunov (three silver, one bronze) who was competing for the Olympic Athletes from Russia. Norwegian cross-country skier Johannes Høsflot Klæbo and French biathlete Martin Fourcade tied for the most gold medals, with three each. Ester Ledecká of the Czech Republic became the first female Winter Olympian to achieve a gold medal in two separate sports at a single Games, winning in both alpine skiing and snowboarding.

Medal table

The medal table is based on information provided by the International Olympic Committee (IOC) and is consistent with IOC convention in its published medal tables. By default, the table is ordered by the number of gold medals the athletes from a nation have won, where nation is an entity represented by a National Olympic Committee (NOC). The number of silver medals is taken into consideration next and then the number of bronze medals. If there is still a tie after that, then the nations shared the tied rank and are listed alphabetically according to their NOC code.

Changes in medal standings

See also
2018 Winter Paralympics medal table

References

External links
 
 
 

Medal table
South Korea sport-related lists
Winter Olympics medal tables